Alfonso Di Guida (born 1 May 1954, in Naples) is an Italian former sprinter (400 m). He was italian record holder with the 4x400 metres relay national team.

Biography
In his career he won 4 times the national championships.

National records
 4x400 metres relay: 3:01.42 ( Zagreb, 16 August 1981) - with Stefano Malinverni, Roberto Ribaud, Mauro Zuliani

Achievements

National titles
3 wins in 400 metres at the Italian Athletics Championships (1974, 1976, 1977)
1 win in 400 metres at the Italian Athletics Indoor Championships (1976)

References

External links
 

1973 births
Athletes from Naples
Italian male sprinters
Living people
Athletes (track and field) at the 1976 Summer Olympics
Olympic athletes of Italy
Mediterranean Games bronze medalists for Italy
Athletes (track and field) at the 1975 Mediterranean Games
Athletes (track and field) at the 1979 Mediterranean Games
Universiade medalists in athletics (track and field)
Mediterranean Games medalists in athletics
Universiade bronze medalists for Italy
Italian Athletics Championships winners
Medalists at the 1979 Summer Universiade